Tadeusz Witold Szulc (July 25, 1926 – May 21, 2001) was an author and foreign correspondent for The New York Times from 1953 to 1972. Szulc is credited with breaking the story of the Bay of Pigs invasion.

Early life
Szulc was born in Warsaw, Poland, the son of Seweryn and Janina Baruch Szulc. He attended Institut Le Rosey in Switzerland. In 1940 he emigrated from Poland to join his family in Brazil; it had left Poland in the mid-1930s.

In Brazil, he studied at the University of Brazil, but in 1945, he abandoned his studies to work as a reporter for the Associated Press in Rio de Janeiro.

Early career
In 1947 he moved from Brazil to New York City, and in 1954, he became a US citizen. His emigration had been sponsored by United States Ambassador John Cooper Wiley, who was married to his aunt.

New York Times
From 1953 to 1972, Szulc was a foreign correspondent for The New York Times.

In 1961, Szulc reported on preparations for a US-sponsored assault on Cuba by anti-Castro forces - the counterinsurgency that would become known as The Bay of Pigs Invasion.  This reporting, and the stories published in the New York Times, have become the subject of a long-standing dispute about whether the U.S. government tried to suppress the story, and whether the New York Times went along and killed it.

In The Powers That Be, David Halberstam writes that "In early 1961 Tad Szulc of the New York Times, who had very good Latin-American sources, picked up the story that the CIA was recruiting and training Cuban exiles at a camp in Guatemala."  According to Halberstam, Szulc was far from the only journalist who knew about the preparations: "The training camp was something of an open secret.  The Nation had written an editorial about it in 1960, but there had been an almost deliberate attempt by the rest of the American press not to know too much about it."

Halberstam reports that as word began to leak out that Szulc was planning to publish an article about the invasion preparations, "President Kennedy called Scotty Reston, the Times's Washington bureau chief, and tried to get him to kill it.  Kennedy argued strongly and passionately about what the Szulc story would do to his policy and spoke darkly of what the Times's responsibilities should be.... Reston, somewhat shaken, called Orvil Dryfoos, the publisher, and passed on Kennedy's comments.... Reston suggested toning down the story and removing the references to the forthcoming invasion.  Dryfoos agreed and ordered the story sanitized."

The Times editors agreed to remove the word "imminent" from the article, reasoning that the word was a prediction more than a provable fact.  They also decided to remove the references to the CIA's role in planning the attack, changing the references to "U.S. officials."  Perhaps most importantly, they decided to run the article under a single-column headline instead the four-column banner that had been planned - a headline which would have designated the story as one of "exceptional importance," according to the memoir of Times reporter Harrison Salisbury. 

According to Halberstam, because of these choices "Some editors in New York were absolutely enraged, and they demanded that Dryfoos meet with them.  It was a very heated meeting.  Dryfoos was clearly surprised by the degree of anger among his own people."  Nevertheless, Dryfoos held firm, and the "much sanitized" version of the story ran on April 7, 1961, followed by more reporting in later articles.  

The invasion took place on April 16th, and was crushed by Castro's Cuban Revolutionary Forces within three days.

According to American University scholar W. Joseph Campbell, the decision by the Times to "sanitize" its coverage has swelled into a mythical event in which President Kennedy called Dryfoos directly to demand that the newspaper spike the story, and Dryfoos agreed not to run it at all.  Given the publication of Szulc's article on April 7, that version is clearly myth.  Campbell has also found no evidence in White House phone logs to support the notion that Kennedy called Dryfoos on April 6. But his published findings do not refute Halberstam's assertion that Kennedy called Reston, and Reston passed on Kennedy's pressures to Dryfoos.

Szulc's interest in Cuba continued over time, and he published an in-depth biography of Fidel Castro.

In 1968, Szulc was a reporter in Czechoslovakia during the Soviet invasion against the Prague Spring.

Szulc has also written articles regarding Latin America for several other publications, including The New Yorker, Esquire, Penthouse, National Geographic, and The Progressive.

Death and legacy
In 2001, Szulc died of cancer at his home, in Washington, D.C. He was survived by his wife and his two children.

He was a Knight of the French Légion d'honneur.

Books

Pope John Paul II: The Biography
Chopin in Paris: The Life and Times of the Romantic Composer, Scribner, 1998
The Secret Alliance: The Extraordinary Story of the Rescue of the Jews Since World War II
Fidel: A Critical Portrait
To Kill The Pope : An Ecclesiastical Thriller
Twilight of the Tyrants
The Cuban Invasion
The Winds of Resolution
Dominican Diary
Latin America
The Bombs of Palomares
Portrait of Spain
Czechoslovakia Since World War II
Innocents at Home
Compulsive Spy: The Strange Career of E. Howard Hunt
The Illusion of Peace: Foreign Policy in the Nixon Years, Viking, 1978
 Then and Now: How the World Has Changed Since WW II 

References

External links
Tad Szulc Collection of Interview Transcripts with Fidel Castro and other government officials in Cuba and with Cuban exiles in Miami, Florida, from 1984 to 1985, Cuban Heritage Collection of the University of Miami Libraries

1926 births
2001 deaths
Alumni of Institut Le Rosey
20th-century American non-fiction writers
American reporters and correspondents
Brazilian emigrants to the United States
Deaths from liver cancer
Deaths from lung cancer
Maria Moors Cabot Prize winners
Polish emigrants to Brazil
The New York Times writers
Polish expatriates in Switzerland
20th-century American male writers